Brendan Griffin (born 28 August 1935) is an Irish former Fine Gael politician. A national schoolteacher by profession, he was an unsuccessful candidate in the Tipperary South constituency at the 1969 general election. He was first elected to Dáil Éireann as a Fine Gael Teachta Dála (TD) for Tipperary South at the 1973 general election, replacing party colleague Patrick Hogan who had died the previous October. 

He was re-elected at each subsequent general election until he lost his seat at the 1989 general election to Fine Gael running-mate Theresa Ahearn, despite gaining more first preference votes than her. He later served as a member of South Tipperary County Council from 1991 to 2004.

References

1935 births
Living people
Fine Gael TDs
Members of the 20th Dáil
Members of the 21st Dáil
Members of the 22nd Dáil
Members of the 23rd Dáil
Members of the 24th Dáil
Members of the 25th Dáil
Politicians from County Tipperary
Irish schoolteachers
Local councillors in South Tipperary